Liang Zhanhao (born 22 May 1997) is a Chinese footballer.

Club career
Liang Zhanhao started his professional football career in August 2016 when he was loaned to Hong Kong Premier League side R&F, which was the satellite team of Guangzhou R&F. He made his senior league debut on 1 November 2016 in a 2–0 home defeat against South China. He was named in Guangzhou R&F's first team squad in January 2017. Liang was loaned to R&F again in July 2017 for the 2017–18 season.

Career statistics
Statistics accurate as of match played 20 June 2017.

1League Cups include Hong Kong Senior Challenge Shield and Hong Kong Sapling Cup.

References

1997 births
Living people
Association football defenders
Chinese footballers
Footballers from Zhaoqing
Guangzhou City F.C. players
R&F (Hong Kong) players
Chinese Super League players
Hong Kong Premier League players